This article contains a list of international databases on individual student achievement tests that can be used for psychometric research. In other words, this table only includes datasets containing items measuring ability and directly answered by students.

See also 

 List of online databases

References 

Academic publishing

academic databases
Bibliographic databases and indexes
 Databases